The Papuan pygmy mulga snake (Pseudechis rossignolii) is a venomous snake of the family Elapidae native to New Guinea, genetically confirmed as a distinct species in 2017. It was originally described by Raymond Hoser in 2000 as Pailsus rossignolii, naming it for Victorian snake handler Fred Rossignoli.

References 

Pseudechis
Reptiles described in 2000
Snakes of New Guinea